Probation Officer was a British TV series that ran from 1959-62 about probation officers. It was made by Associated Television and starred John Paul, Jessica Spencer, David Davies and John Scott. Other actors who appeared in the series include Henry Oscar, Honor Blackman, Windsor Davies and Billy Milton.

It was created by Julian Bond and was the first ever one-hour TV drama to screen on ITV. Bond spent months researching the show from real life cases.

Cast
John Paul as Philip Main (53 episodes, 1959-1961) 
John Scott as	 Bert Bellman (33 episodes, 1959-1962) 
Jessica Spencer as Maggie Weston (32 episodes, 1960-1962) 
David Davies as Jim Blake (20 episodes, 1959-1960)
Henry Oscar as Magistrate (15 episodes, 1960-1961)
A.J. Brown as Judge (12 episodes, 1959-1961) 
Jack Stewart as Andrew Wallace (10 episodes, 1959-1960) 
Honor Blackman as Iris Cope (9 episodes, 1959) 
Humphrey Heathcote as Jailer (9 episodes, 1959-1961) 
Windsor Davies as Bill Morgan (8 episodes, 1962) 
Bernard Brown as Stephen Ryder (8 episodes, 1961-1962)
Betty Hardy as Miss Randell (7 episodes, 1959) 
John Barrett as Clerk of Court (6 episodes, 1960-1962)

References

External links
Probation Officer at IMDb
Probation Officer at UKTV
Probation Officer at Cherished Television

1959 British television series debuts
1962 British television series endings
1950s British drama television series
1960s British drama television series
ITV television dramas
Television series by ITV Studios
Television shows produced by Associated Television (ATV)
English-language television shows